Roza Guliyeva (born 28 March 1998) is an Azerbaijani footballer who plays as a midfielder for Georgian Women's Championship club FC Nike Tbilisi and the Azerbaijan women's national team.

See also
List of Azerbaijan women's international footballers

References

1998 births
Living people
Women's association football midfielders
Azerbaijani women's footballers
Azerbaijan women's international footballers
Azerbaijani expatriate footballers
Azerbaijani expatriate sportspeople in Georgia (country)
Expatriate footballers in Georgia (country)